The 1983 São Paulo F.C. season details the competitions entered, matches played and teams faced by the São Paulo Futebol Clube in the 1983 season, showing the result in each event. Both friendly and official events are included. São Paulo Futebol Clube is a professional football club based in São Paulo, Brazil. They play in the Campeonato Paulista, São Paulo's state league, and the Campeonato Brasileiro Série A or Brasileirão, Brazil's national league.

Statistics

Scorers

Overall

{|class="wikitable"
|-
|Games played || 73 (22 Campeonato Brasileiro, 48 Campeonato Paulista, 3 Friendly match)
|-
|Games won || 38 (13 Campeonato Brasileiro, 24 Campeonato Paulista, 1 Friendly match)
|-
|Games drawn || 23 (5 Campeonato Brasileiro, 18 Campeonato Paulista, 0 Friendly match)
|-
|Games lost || 12 (4 Campeonato Brasileiro, 6 Campeonato Paulista, 2 Friendly match)
|-
|Goals scored || 125
|-
|Goals conceded || 67
|-
|Goal difference || +58
|-
|Best result || 5–1 (H) v Uberaba - Campeonato Brasileiro - 1983.4.2
|-
|Worst result || 1–5 (A) v Grêmio - Campeonato Brasileiro - 1983.4.17
|-
|Top scorer || Renato (33)
|-

Friendlies

Trans-Atlantic Challenge Cup

Official competitions

Campeonato Brasileiro

Record

Campeonato Paulista

Record

External links
official website 

Association football clubs 1983 season
1983
1983 in Brazilian football